Line 2 is an east–west line in the Shanghai Metro network. With a daily ridership of over 1.9 million, it is the busiest line on the Shanghai Metro. The line is colored light green on system maps.

History
This section, which included 12 stations, totaled . A year later,  was added to the eastern part of the line, adding . This section added  to the line. Four years later, in preparation for the 2010 Shanghai World Expo, the line was significantly expanded. In February, the Zhangjiang Hi-Tech Park station was rebuilt. On July 1,  opens to the public with the opening of the railway station of the same name.

In October 2006, it was decided to rename three stations on line 2 by the end of the year, adopting a new naming scheme: metro stations, unlike bus stops, are no longer supposed to be named after neighbouring vertical streets, but famous streets and sights in the vicinity, making it easier for visitors to find these places. The renamed stations are Century Avenue (formerly Dongfang Road), East Nanjing Road (formerly Middle Henan Road) and West Nanjing Road (formerly Shimen No. 1 Road).

<onlyinclude>

Up to April 19, 2019, when an eight-car train started serving the whole line 2 in a regular schedule, the east section of line 2 was served by a four-car fleet. Line 2 had a piecewise service pattern during morning peak hours whereby the suburban segment between Guanglan Road station and Pudong International Airport station is partially served by a four-car fleet in addition to the regular eight-car fleet serving the whole line. Already since 28 December 2018, during off-peak times, an eight-car fleet from East Xujing or Songhong Road station may terminate at Pudong International Airport station, but most trains still terminate at Guanglan Road station or Tangzhen (only during peak hours).

Stations

Service routes

Important stations

East Xujing to West Nanjing Road
The line heads northeastward under Xumin East Road for about  before veering off the road and heading east, passing under Huaxiang Road. This station is an interchange with line 10. The line then enters the  along Changning Road, an interchange with lines 3 and 4. The subway line then runs parallel under Changning Road for a short distance before heading east under Yuyuan Road. Line 2 comes back under the road shortly thereafter.

West Nanjing Road to Longyang Road

Leaving the Huangpu District of Shanghai, the line heads under the Huangpu River and enters the Pudong New Area of Shanghai.

Longyang Road to Pudong International Airport
Line 2 heads eastward, running under Zuchongzhi Road to the  station.

Future expansion

East expansion
As part of the phase IV extension of Shanghai Pudong International Airport terminal T3 will be built south of the current terminals T1, T2 and satellite terminal. The terminal T3 will be served by extending line 2 south by one station.

West expansion
The extension of Metro line 2 to the west will improve the connection of the Hongqiao business hub to the city center and Pudong.

Station name change
 On 28 October 2006, Dongfang Road was renamed as the  after station renovation for line 2 and the opening of line 4.

Headways 
<onlyinclude>

Technology

Power supply
Siemens Transportation Systems equipped this line with an overhead contact line (cantilever material: galvanized steel) and 7 DC traction power supply substations.

Signaling
As the first part of Line 2 was opened 20 years ago and the line has been experiencing congestion after rapid ridership growth. In 2014, Shanghai Metro investigated upgrading the existing signal system of line 2 (US&S United Signal AF900, fixed block CBTC) to increase the frequency of trains and reduce congestion. In October 2020, a new CASCO Tranavi (moving block CBTC, DTO) signaling system was overlaid on the existing signaling system on Line 2. The Metro line will be the first in the world to have two signal systems, the new primary one for day-to-day operations and the existing older one serving as a backup system during signal faults. Intervals of trains on Line 2 could be reduced to 90 seconds thanks to the new signal system with the backup system capable of maintaining two minute headways. For the new system, a total of 100 trains on Line 2 will have their onboard signal systems upgraded. As of 2020 upgrading work was finished on 31 trains (the new 02A05 series).

Rolling stock
When line 2 was opened to traffic, the AC02 train where not available. Therefore, some of the DC01 and AC01 series trains were borrowed from line 1.

Former Rolling Stock
When line 2 was first opened to traffic, the AC02 trains did not arrive, so some DC01 and AC01 trains were seconded from line 1.

References

Siemens Mobility projects
Shanghai Metro lines
 
Railway lines opened in 1999
1999 establishments in China
Airport rail links in China